John Vivian (or John Vyvyan) may refer to:

Politicians
John Vivian (died 1691), MP for Mitchell
John Vivian (died 1577), MP for Helston
John Charles Vivian (1887–1964), United States attorney, journalist, Governor of Colorado
John Vivian (Liberal politician) (1818–1879), English Liberal politician
John Henry Vivian (1785–1855), Welsh industrialist and politician of Cornish extraction
John Ennis Vivian, British Member of Parliament for Truro

Others
John Vivian (historian) (died 1771), Regius Professor of Modern History at Oxford, 1768–1771
John Vivian (1750–1826), Welsh industrialist of Cornish extraction
John Vivian, 4th Baron Swansea (1925–2005), British peer, sports shooter and lobbyist
John Lambrick Vivian (1830–1896), genealogist and historian
John Vivyan (May 31, 1915 – December 20, 1983) an American stage and television actor
John Vyvyan (1908–1975), writer on animal rights
Johnny Vyvyan (John Vyvyan, 1924–1984), Australian-born actor, appeared in Hancock's Half Hour and other British series

See also
John Vivian Dacie (1912–2005), British haematologist